Donald Cochrane (27 May 1917 – 31 March 1983) was an Australian econometrician. He was a long-time faculty member at the University of Melbourne, and is known for developing the Cochrane–Orcutt estimation procedure.

A native of Melbourne, Cochrane graduated from the University of Melbourne in 1945, after serving in the Royal Australian Air Force during World War II. He continued his studies at Clare College, Cambridge, earning a doctorate under supervision of Richard Stone.

References 

1917 births
1983 deaths
Time series econometricians
University of Melbourne alumni
Alumni of Clare College, Cambridge
Academic staff of the University of Melbourne
Royal Australian Air Force personnel of World War II
20th-century Australian mathematicians
20th-century Australian economists
Military personnel from Melbourne
People from Malvern, Victoria
Scientists from Melbourne